Kuzuluk can refer to:

 Kuzuluk, Aziziye
 Kuzuluk, İskilip
 Kuzuluk, Refahiye